The nuraghe Losa (in Sardinia, close to the village of Abbasanta) is a complex prehistoric building in the shape of a tholos tomb. Its central structure has a triangular shape.

On the west side, a turreted wall is linked to it. The whole built complex is surrounded by a wider wall, which encloses the settlement of the original village of huts and other additional buildings constructed in the late Punic, imperial Roman, late Roman and high Middle Ages periods. The central tower was built in the 14th century BC, while the surrounding walls and towers were built in the 13th century BC.

References

Bibliography

External links 
 Website for Nuraghe Losa
 Tharros.info: Site Description Nuraghe Losa

Buildings and structures completed in the 13th century BC
Losa
Nuraghe
Archaeological sites in Sardinia
National museums of Italy
Beehive tombs